The Piano Teacher may refer to
 The Piano Teacher (Jelinek novel), a 1983 novel by Elfriede Jelinek
 The Piano Teacher (film) a 2001 film, based on the Jelinek novel
 The Piano Teacher (Lee novel), a 2009 novel by Janice Y. K. Lee
 The Piano Teacher (Tanenbaum book), a nonfiction book by Robert K. Tanenbaum about convicted killer Charles Yukl
 Piano teacher, a private or classroom instructor of piano performance